is one of the 100 Famous Japanese Mountains. The  peak lies in the Ashio Mountains of Japan, on the border of Nikkō in Tochigi Prefecture and Numata in Gunma Prefecture. Mount Sukai is an old stratovolcano, but with the whole mountain covered in forest today it does not appear like a typical volcano.

Hiking routes 

The Nokogiri (Japanese: saw) ridge between Mount Koshin and Mount Nokogiri on the Tochigi side features eleven peaks. There is also a winding trail avoiding the eleven peak ridge and Mount Koshin. It leads south of the ridge to  before joining the ridge trail at Mount Nokogiri.

Religiously motivated mountain climbing in form of a three-mountain-race along Mounts Koshin, Nokogiri and Sukai was practised in the Edo period. There are ladders along the ascent to Mount Koshin and the ups and downs on Nokogiri's ridges. Many chains are present in precipitous spots. The route is not recommended for beginners.

There are onsen at the trailhead in Ginzandaira. Lodging and bathing is possible here.

Making use of private transport the summit can be climbed in relatively short time along the Fudosawa route on the Gunma side.

Mountain huts 
There is the unmanned  near the summit of Mount Koshin.

See also
List of volcanoes in Japan
List of mountains in Japan

Summits in the surrounding 
 , Known for the butterwort Pinguicula ramosa which grows here in the wild.

External links
 
 Sukai San - Geological Survey of Japan

Mountains of Tochigi Prefecture
Mountains of Gunma Prefecture
Volcanoes of Gunma Prefecture
Volcanoes of Tochigi Prefecture
Pleistocene stratovolcanoes
Stratovolcanoes of Japan
Volcanoes of Honshū